"Superstar" is a song by Australian musician Jade MacRae and was released in September 2005 as the third and final single from her debut album Jade MacRae. "Superstar" features a rap from Sydney-based rapper 6Pound.

Music video
The music video was filmed in a factory in Melbourne. The video consists of Jade singing and dancing in an underground club with different people.

Track listing
CD Single
 "Superstar" (Radio edit)
 "Superstar" (Crooked Eye remix)
 "Lazy Afternoon"

Charts

References

2005 singles
Songs written by Jade MacRae
2005 songs
Songs written by Israel Cruz